Via dei Tribunali is a street in the old historic center of Naples, Italy.

It was the main decumanus or Decumanus Maggiore — that is, the main east-west street—of the ancient Greek and then Roman city of Neapolis, paralleled to the south by the lower decumanus (Decumano Inferiore, now called Spaccanapoli) and to the north by the upper decumanus (Decumano Superiore) (now via Anticaglia and Via della Sapienza). The three decumani were (and still are) intersected by numerous north-south cross-streets called cardini, together forming the grid of the ancient city. The modern streets/alleys that overlie and follow the ancient grid of these ancient streets.

The length of the modern Via dei Tribunali was determined by the urban expansion requirements of the Spanish starting in the early 16th century. The street runs from the church of San Pietro a Maiella and adjacent Naples Music Conservatory at the west end of the old city for about three-quarters of a mile, passing the central cross-road at via San Gregorio Armeno, then crossing via Duomo near the Cathedral of Naples and ending at what was, until quite recently, the main Naples courthouse (Italian: Tribunale), from which the street draws its name.

Buildings and Structures
The following are important or ancient buildings along the Street from East to West:
Church of Santa Maria della Mercede e Sant'Alfonso Maria de' Liguori
Sant'Antonio delle Monache a Port'Alba
Conservatory of San Pietro a Majella
Church of San Pietro a Majella
Church of Croce di Lucca
Pontano Chapel
Church of Santa Maria Maggiore alla Pietrasanta
Palazzo Spinelli di Laurino
Palazzo Filippo d'Angiò
Basilica Church of San Paolo Maggiore
Basilica Church of San Lorenzo Maggiore
Church of Santa Maria delle Anime del Purgatorio ad Arco
Church of Girolamini
Church of Santa Maria della Colonna
Duomo di Napoli (at corner of via Duomo)
Guglia di San Gennaro
Palazzo Caracciolo di Gioiosa
Pio Monte della Misericordia
Church of Santa Maria della Pace
Church of Santa Maria del Rifugio
Church of San Tommaso a Capuana
Chapel of the Monte dei Poveri
Castel Capuano
Guglia di San Gaetano

Tribunali